Jhack Tepora (born April 8, 1995) is a Filipino professional boxer who is the former interim World Boxing Association Featherweight champion.

Professional career

Tepora turned professional in 2012 and won 21 consecutive fights before challenging and beating Mexican boxer Edivaldo Ortega for the vacant WBA interim featherweight title.

Professional boxing record

Personal life
Tepora has a wife named Dinah Comision Tepora

See also
List of featherweight boxing champions
History of boxing in the Philippines

References

External links

1995 births
Living people
Filipino male boxers
Boxers from Cebu
Sportspeople from Cebu City
Super-bantamweight boxers
Featherweight boxers
Super-featherweight boxers
World featherweight boxing champions
World Boxing Association champions